Ke Bani Crorepati (Bhojpuri: के बनी क्रोरेपती) or KBC Bhojpuri was the one of 9 Indian versions for Bhojpuri-speaking peoples. It was aired from June 6 to July 29, 2011, on Mahuaa TV channel. It was hosted by Shatrughan Sinha. Top prize was Rs. 1,00,00,000/-.

Rules 
In this show, the show appeared the clock. Each contestant had 30 seconds for questions 1-5 and 45 seconds for questions 6-10. From questions 11-15, the clock was absent.

Lifelines 
In this season, three lifelines used:

 50:50:- If the contestant would use this lifeline, the host would ask the computer to remove two of the wrong answers. This would remain one right answer and one wrong answer. This would help a contestant giving 50% chance of answering the correct answer.
 Phone-a-Friend:- If the contestant would use this lifeline, the contestant would be allowed to call one of the three pre-arranged friends, who all have to provide their phone numbers in advance. The host would usually be started off by talking to the contestant's friend and introduces him/her to the viewers. After the introduction, the host would hand the phone call over to the contestant, who then immediately had 30 seconds to ask and hope for a reply from their friend.
 Audience Poll:- If any contestant would use this lifeline, the host would repeat the question to the audience. The studio audience would get 10 seconds to answer the question. Audience members would use touchpads to give the answer what they believe. After the audience would have chosen their choices, their choices would be displayed to the contestant in percentages in bar-graph format and also shown on the monitors screens of the host and contestant, as well as the TV viewers.

Money Tree

Winners

Top Prize Winners 

 Rajesh Singh - Rs. 1,00,00,000/- (July 27, 2011)

The biggest winners 

 Sonakshi Sinha - Rs. 25,00,000/- (June 17, 2011)
 Kaushalendra Kumar Shukla - Rs. 25,00,000/- (June 22, 2011)
 Dr. Kuldip Singh - Rs. 25,00,000/- (July 13, 2011)
 Hema Malini - Rs. 25,00,000/- (July 29, 2011)
 Dharmendra - Rs. 25,00,000/- (August 8, 2011)

Rs. 0/- winners 

 Tiku Chhabra (August 4, 2011) (4th question wrong)

Controversy 
Shatrughan Sinha filed a report against the top officials of Mahuaa channel. He hosts the game show Ke Bani Crorepati, which is based on Kaun Banega Crorepati and confirms that the makers of the show did not give many of the celebrity guests, the amount they won on the show. Not that the celebrities are asking, but most of that money was supposed to go for charity, and that makes the Shatrughan even more furious. He has convicted the makers for approximately Rs. 1.75 crore/-. As a good host of the show, Sinha had roped in celebs like Dharmendra, Hema Malini, Govinda and Sonakshi Sinha and along with former finance minister, Yashwant Sinha as guest participants. Also, the BJP parliamentarian accused the channel of subtracting Rs. 25 lakhs/- as tax deducted at source (TDS) from his remuneration, but never depositing that amount to the Income Tax department. The program was produced by BIG Synergy Media Limited for Mahuaa, who had contacted Sonakshi Sinha’s father in early 2011 to anchor the show, which was to have 50 episodes in all with prize money amounting to Rs. 1 crore/-. According to Sinha all these were done in bad faith and the channel must, at once, pay the dues. Bollywoodlife.com said that he did a very noble deed by taking the matter to the police.

References 

Who Wants to Be a Millionaire?
2011 Indian television series debuts
Indian reality television series
Indian game shows
Indian television series based on British television series
Bhojpuri-language television shows